Rohnerville Elementary School District was a public school district based in Humboldt County, California, United States. Effective July 1, 2012, it consolidated with Fortuna Union Elementary School District to form Fortuna Elementary School District.

References

School districts in Humboldt County, California
2012 disestablishments in California